The Stockholm Swedish Lutheran Church and Cemetery is a historic building and cemetery in Shickley, Nebraska. The parish was established in 1875 by immigrants from Sweden. In 1878, they turned a five-acre parcel into a cemetery. The church was built in 1900-1901 by A. A. Gustafson, and designed in the Gothic Revival style by architect N. K. Aldrich. It has been listed on the National Register of Historic Places since June 30, 1995.

References

National Register of Historic Places in Fillmore County, Nebraska
Gothic Revival architecture in Nebraska
Churches completed in 1878
Swedish-American culture in Nebraska